Xiangyang Subdistrict is a subdistrict in Yingdong District, Fuyang, Anhui, China. , it has 7 residential communities under its administration.

See also 
 List of township-level divisions of Anhui

References 

Township-level divisions of Anhui
Fuyang